FC Rapid Ghidighici was a Moldova Republic football club based in Ghidighici. They played in the Divizia Naţională, the top division in Moldova Republic football. It was founded in 2005 in the 'A' Division. FC Rapid is the ex Steaua Chişinău which quit the professional game due to financial difficulties. In summer 2008 it merged with CSCA Chişinău to create CSCA-Rapid Chişinău.

External links 
 
Team profile at sports.md

Rapid Ghidighici
Rapid Ghidighici
Association football clubs established in 2005
Association football clubs disestablished in 2008
2005 establishments in Moldova
2008 disestablishments in Moldova